The Centralist Republican Party (PRC) was a Spanish political party created by Nicolás Salmerón in 1886 as a split from the Progressive Republican Party.

References

See also
Liberalism and radicalism in Spain

Defunct political parties in Spain
Political parties established in 1886
Political parties disestablished in 1903
1886 establishments in Spain
1903 disestablishments in Spain
Radical parties
Republican parties in Spain
Restoration (Spain)